The Somali lark (Mirafra somalica) is a species of lark in the family Alaudidae endemic to Somalia.

Taxonomy and systematics 
The Somali lark was originally classified as belonging to the genus Certhilauda. The term "Somali lark" is also used as an alternate name for both Archer's lark and Sharpe's lark. The term "red Somali lark" is also used as an alternate name for Sharpe's lark. Other alternate names include red Somali lark, Somali bushlark and Somali long-billed lark.

Subspecies
Two subspecies are recognized: 
 M. s. somalica - (Witherby, 1903): Found in northern Somalia
 M. s. rochei - Colston, 1982: Found in central Somalia

Distribution and habitat 
The range of M. somalica is somewhat large, with an estimated global extent of occurrence of 270,000 km2.

Its natural habitat is subtropical or tropical dry lowland grassland.

References

Somali lark
Endemic birds of Somalia
Somali lark
Taxonomy articles created by Polbot